Norman John Trollope MBE (born 14 June 1943) is a former footballer, manager and coach who served Swindon Town in various capacities for nearly 40 years. Trollope holds the record for the number of Football League appearances made for one club - turning out for the Town in 770 games between 1960 and 1980, an achievement which saw him appointed Member of the Order of the British Empire (MBE) in the 1978 Birthday Honours.

Playing career 
Trollope made his debut for the club on 20 August 1960 in a 1–1 draw with Halifax Town, when he was aged seventeen and missed two matches that season. Trollope was an ever-present in the side in the 1962–63 season - a trend which continued for seven seasons. A run of 368 consecutive matches was brought to an end in August 1968, when he sustained a broken arm in a match at Hartlepool United. He didn't return to the team until January - by which time he had missed most of Swindon's League Cup run. He only appeared in the competition twice that season - in the first game against Torquay United, and in the final at Wembley, where Swindon beat Arsenal 3–1.

Trollope continued to be a regular member of the side right up until the 1978–79 season, when he made sixteen appearances. He announced his retirement at the end of the season, and moved into the club's backroom staff. However, after an appalling start to the 1980–81 season, Trollope was pushed back into action - a move which allowed him to break the appearance record - previously set at 764 appearances by Portsmouth's Jimmy Dickinson. He finally retired from the playing staff at the end of that season.

Managerial career 
Following his retirement from playing, Trollope replaced Bobby Smith as the club's manager early in the following season. His time as manager was far from successful - working on a shoestring budget, he led Swindon to their first ever relegation to Division Four. He made way for Ken Beamish near the end of the 1982–83 season.

Even this wasn't the end of Trollope's times at Swindon - he was appointed assistant manager to Lou Macari during Easter 1985, and he took charge of the youth team under Ossie Ardiles, Glenn Hoddle, John Gorman and Steve McMahon before finally leaving the club in 1996. His time on the coaching staff took in Swindon's climb from the old Fourth Division to the FA Premier League between 1986 and 1993, although by the time he left they had suffered two consecutive relegations and were on the verge of another promotion. He would later work for Wolverhampton Wanderers, before returning to Swindon in 2008 to take up the role of Under 15's coach in the Centre of Excellence.

Personal life 
Trollope's son Paul Trollope became a professional footballer who played for Wales internationally, before becoming a manager.

Career statistics

Honours
Swindon Town
 Football League Cup: 1968–69

References

External links
 Profile at Swindon-Town-FC.co.uk

1943 births
Living people
Sportspeople from Swindon
English footballers
Association football defenders
English Football League players
Swindon Town F.C. players
English football managers
Swindon Town F.C. managers
Members of the Order of the British Empire